Al-Quds Committee, also known by its affiliated arm name adopted in 1995, Bayt Mal Al Quds Agency, is an intergovernmental organization and one of the 4 standing committees of the Organisation of Islamic Cooperation established in July 1975. It is focused on cultural, political, social, religious and human rights issues in Jerusalem caused by the Israeli–Palestinian conflict. Its principles are predominantly focused on the protection of Al-Aqsa Mosque, and cultural heritage of the city in addition to serving as an advocacy agency specialized in humanitarian and social works, concerning health, education housing children's as well as women's rights.

It runs several projects in the city of Jerusalem such as sports activities, health awareness programs, and educational scholarships, in addition to serving as a financial assistance institute for the restoration of war-affected houses. As of July 2021, it as financed about $57 million to run its projects concerning social, cultural, education, health and housing in Jerusalem and Palestine. It is also entrusted with advocating for the support of King Hassan II College of Environmental and Agricultural Sciences in Gaza.

Administration background 
The committee is dependently run and administrated by the OIC Council of Foreign Ministers of the 16 member states. In addition to being financed by the member states, the committee has also run protects contributed by public and private vendors, including organisations and individuals. The Kingdom of Morocco is the largest contributor of 87% funds which declined significantly since the last 3 years. King of Morocco serves as its chairperson.

History 
Al-Quds Committee was established after the OIC Council of Foreign Ministers adopted a resolution No. 1/6-P between 12 and 15 July 1975. The summit was hosted in Jeddah, Saudi Arabia. The idea of Bayt Mal al-Quds Agency initiative was originally introduced by the king of Morocco, Hassan II in the 15the session held in Ifrane, Morocco in 1995. The idea came into effect between 9 and 13 December 1995 in the 23rd session held in Conakry, Guinea and hence Bayt Mal al-Quds Agency was established as an affiliate agency of Al-Quds Committee.

Bayt Mal al-Quds was formally created on 30 July 1998 after it was granted legal status by the OIC Council of Foreign. T
It held its first meeting on 14 February 2000 under the leadership of Morocco king, Mohammed VI in the presence of Secretary General of the Organisation of Islamic Cooperation.

Bayt Mal Al-Quds Agency is administered by finance ministers of the member states. Its Trusteeship Committee consists of foreign affairs ministers of five member, including the foreign ministers of the Morocco and Palestine. It is headquartered at Ilôt2, Av. Attine, Hay Riad, Rabat, Morocco.

Role of Morocco 
The Kingdom of Morocco plays a significant role in Al-Quds Committee. The committee received maximum fundraising contribution from the country. However, following the 2020 diplomatic developments between Israel and Morocco, the Islamic Supreme Committee and the Justice and Development urged the OIC and Palestine Liberation Organization for the revocation of Morocco's membership and chairmanship following by the Israel–Morocco normalization agreement. Within a span of 22 years, Morocco’s Bayt Mal Al Qods Agency Carried Out 200 ‘Major’ Projects and dozens of small and medium projects, which costed $64 million (MAD 657.5 million), have benefited all segments of Al Quds residents.

Membership 
OIC has a membership of 57 Muslim nations, however the Al-Quds Committee is signed by 16 countries, including Morocco, Saudi Arabia, Jordan, Iraq, Palestine, Lebanon, Mauritania, Egypt, Bangladesh, Pakistan, Iran, Indonesia, Senegal, Niger, and Guinea. The OIC suspended Syria's membership in 2012, and thus it is longer a part of the Al-Quds Committee.

References

Further reading 
 
 

Organisation of Islamic Cooperation standing committees
1975 establishments in Morocco
Organizations based in Rabat
Islamic relief organizations
Occupational safety and health organizations